Biotinylated dextran amines (BDA) are organic compounds used as anterograde and retrograde neuroanatomical tracers. They can be used for labeling the source as well as the point of termination of neural connections and therefore to study neural pathways.

BDA is delivered into the nervous system by iontophoretic or pressure injection and visualized with an avidin-biotinylated horseradish peroxidase procedure, followed by a standard or metal-enhanced diaminobenzidine (DAB) reaction. Samples can then be analyzed by optical microscopy as well as by electron microscopy.

High molecular weight BDA (10 kDa) yields sensitive and detailed labeling of axons and terminals, while low molecular weight BDA (3 kDa) yields sensitive and detailed retrograde labeling of neuronal cell bodies.

References 

Amines